Rochedale is an outer southern suburb in the City of Brisbane, Queensland, Australia. Of these 49.5% were male and 50.5% were female.

Geography

The suburb's western boundary is partially aligned with the Gateway Motorway and Bulimba Creek.

As Rochedale backs onto the Priest Gully a wildlife corridor has been set up to preserve the local flora and fauna.

The Brisbane Metro depot for electric buses is located in Rochedale due to its proximity to the South East Busway.  The  site includes a one-megawatt solar power system.

History 
During convict settlement, explorers passed through the region but it was not until 1865 that the first settlers started farming the area's rich alluvial soil.  The area takes its name from the Roche family, who emigrated from Ireland to Australia in 1860 and settled in the region. The family built a homestead they called Rochedale in 1868.

Rochedale State School was established at the intersection of Miles Platting Road and Rochedale Road on 1 April 1931.

In 1956, the Rochedale Scout Group was formed and established a Scout Den on the corner of Grieve and Rochedale Roads. This parcel of land was zoned for recreational use by the Queensland Government.

During the 1960s residential development took off in the area. One local builder, Jack Davey was responsible for some of the new estates off Rochedale Road between Underwood Road and Priestdale Road. Some of the street names are family names such as Rhonda Street and Davey Street. The family lived in the area until the mid 1990s. 

St Peter's Catholic Primary School was established in 1976 by the Presentation Sisters with an initial enrolment of 44 students. 

Redeemer Lutheran College opened on 4 February 1980 with 56 Year 8 students under headmaster Leslie Robin Kleinschmidt. The school was officially opened on 13 April 1980 by Joh Bjelke-Petersen, the Queensland Premier. In 1999, a middle school consisting of Years 6 to 8 was created. In 2007, a junior school consisting of Years Prep to 5 was added.

Rochedale State High School opened on 24 January 1983.

The Rochedale dump began operations in 1991. Its establishment was controversial. A waste-to-energy facility has been generating electricity since 2004.

From 2009, Rochedale is expected to experience major growth from 1,200 residents to over 17,000 over the course of 15–20 years. This is due to 'The Rochedale Urban Community Development' where bush and farm lands have been approved by the Brisbane City Council to be turned into housing estates.

The median age of the Rochedale population was 43 years, 6 years above the Australian median.  64.9% of people living in Rochedale were born in Australia, compared to the national average of 69.8%; the next most common countries of birth were Taiwan 3.8%, England 3.7%, New Zealand 3.5%, Italy 1.2%, United States of America 1.2%.  72.4% of people spoke only English at home; the next most common languages were 4.2% Mandarin, 1.6% Italian, 1.6% Greek, 1.5% Cantonese, 1% Punjabi.

Heritage listings
Rochedale has heritage-listed sites, including:

 447 Miles Platting Road: Native Fern Gardens

Education

Rochedale State School is a government primary (Prep-6) school for boys and girls at 694 Rochedale Road. In 2018, the school had an enrolment of 981 students with 70 teachers (63 full-time equivalent) and 31 non-teaching staff (20 full-time equivalent). It includes a special education program.

St Peter's Primary School is a Catholic primary (Prep-6) school for boys and girls at 955 Rochedale Road. In 2018, the school had an enrolment of 464 students with 33 teachers (27 full-time equivalent) and 20 non-teaching staff (12 full-time equivalent). 

Redeemer Lutheran College is a private primary and secondary (Prep-12) school for boys and girls at 745 Rochedale Road. In 2018, the school had an enrolment of 994 students with 70 teachers (67 full-time equivalent) and 63 non-teaching staff (48 full-time equivalent).

Rochedale State High School is a government secondary (7-12) school for boys and girls at 249 Priestdale Road. In 2018, the school had an enrolment of 1,371 students with 110 teachers (104 full-time equivalent) and 40 non-teaching staff (31 full-time equivalent). It includes a special education program.

Amenities
The suburb of Rochedale is supported by many community organisations including sporting clubs, religious entities, youth organisations and educational groups. 

There are a number of churches, including: 

 St Philip's Anglican Church, 270 Rochedale Road
 St Peter's Catholic Church, 955 Rochedale Road

Transport
The Pacific Motorway passes through western parts of the suburb.  The Mt Gravatt Bus Service provides public transport services in Rochedale to surrounding areas.

See also

 List of Brisbane suburbs

References

External links

 
 
 

Suburbs of the City of Brisbane